, also known as  is a list of 1,026 kanji and associated readings developed and maintained by the Japanese Ministry of Education that prescribes which kanji, and which readings of kanji, Japanese students should learn from first grade to the sixth grade (elementary school). Although the list is designed for Japanese students, it can also be used as a sequence of learning characters by non-native speakers as a means of focusing on the most commonly used kanji.

Kyōiku kanji is a subset (1,026) of the 2,136 characters of Jōyō kanji.

Versions of kyōiku list

1946 created with 881 characters
1977 expanded to 996 characters
1982 expanded to 1,006 characters
2020 expanded to 1,026 characters
The following 20 characters, all used in prefecture names, were added in 2020.
茨 (Ibaraki), 媛 (Ehime), 岡 (Shizuoka, Okayama and Fukuoka), 潟 (Niigata), 岐 (Gifu), 熊 (Kumamoto), 香 (Kagawa), 佐 (Saga), 埼 (Saitama), 崎 (Nagasaki and Miyazaki), 滋 (Shiga), 鹿 (Kagoshima), 縄 (Okinawa), 井 (Fukui), 沖 (Okinawa), 栃 (Tochigi), 奈 (Kanagawa and Nara), 梨 (Yamanashi), 阪 (Ōsaka), 阜 (Gifu)

List by grade
Note 1: Many kanji have complex meanings and nuances, or express concepts not directly translatable into English. In those cases, the English meanings mentioned here are approximate.

Note 2: In the kun'yomi readings, readings after - (hyphen) are Okurigana.

Note 3: A - (hyphen) at the end of the -yomi corresponds to a small tsu in kana, which indicates that the following consonant is geminated.

First grade (80 kanji)

Second grade (160 kanji)

Third grade (200 kanji)

Fourth grade (200 kanji)

Fifth grade (185 kanji)

Sixth grade (181 kanji)

Characters used as parts of names of prefectures (20 kanji)

List by radicals

The following 48 radicals are currently not used within the kyōiku kanji: 16, 17, 23, 26, 35, 43, 45, 55, 68, 71, 73, 89, 92, 95, 97, 98, 99, 103, 114, 121,126, 134, 136, 141, 153, 160, 171, 178, 179, 186, 190, 191, 192, 193, 194, 197, 198, 200, 202, 204, 205, 206, 207, 208, 210, 212, 213, and 214.

The following 44 radicals are currently used in only one kyōiku kanji:
11, 20, 33, 52, 56, 58, 59, 65, 74, 81, 82, 83, 84, 88, 100, 101, 107, 110, 127, 129, 133, 138, 139, 142, 144, 152, 155, 161, 165, 168,176, 177, 182, 183, 185, 188, 189, 195, 196, 199, 201, 203, 209, and 211.

The three most frequent radicals are 9 (57 kanji), 85 (42 kanji), and 75 (37 kanji).

 Radicals 1–54

  Radicals 55–108

 Radicals 109–162

 Radicals 163–214

List by number of strokes

 1-5 strokes
 1 stroke: 1 kanji; 2 strokes: 10 kanji; 3 strokes: 24 kanji; 4 strokes: 46 kanji; 5 strokes: 73 kanji	

 6-10 strokes
 6 strokes: 75 kanji; 7 strokes: 86 kanji; 8 strokes: 110 kanji; 9 strokes: 100 kanji; 10 strokes: 95 kanji

 11-15 strokes
 11 strokes: 97 kanji; 12 strokes: 99 kanji; 13 strokes: 58 kanji; 14 strokes: 52 kanji; 15 strokes: 31 kanji

 16-20 strokes
 16 strokes: 22 kanji; 17 strokes: 7 kanji; 18 strokes: 12 kanji; 19 strokes: 5 kanji; 20 strokes: 3 kanji

List by Unicode code point

List by frequency

Special characters

Kokuji
Kokuji are characters originally created in Japan; two of them are kyōiku kanji:
働 (Grade 4) and 畑 (Grade 3). There are also 8 kokuji within the secondary-school kanji and 16 within the jinmeiyō kanji.
The character 働 and some others are also used in Chinese now, but most kokuji are unknown outside Japan.

Kokkun
Kokkun are characters and combinations of characters that have different meanings in Japanese and Chinese

For example, the character combination 手紙 means 'letter' in Japanese, but 'toilet paper' in Chinese. However, the isolated characters have the same meaning in both languages: 手 (Grade 1) means 'hand', and 紙  (Grade 2) means 'paper'.

Simplified characters and their traditional forms

See also shinjitai and kyūjitai.

Differences in simplification between China and Japan

China and Japan simplified their writing systems independently from each other. After World War II, their relations were hostile, so they did not cooperate. Traditional Chinese characters are still officially used in Hong Kong, Macao, Taiwan, South Korea (as a supplement to Hangul, but they are no longer used in North Korea), and by many overseas Chinese.

In Chinese, many more characters were simplified than in Japanese; some characters were simplified in only one language; other characters were simplified in the same way in both languages, and other characters were simplified in both languages but in different ways. This means that those who want to learn the writing systems of both languages must sometimes learn at least three different variations of one character: traditional Chinese, simplified Chinese, and modern Japanese (for example 兩 - 两 - 両). Some others have more variations, such as (斗 - 鬥 - 鬭 - 鬬 - 鬪 - 鬦 - 闘 - 閗), some of which are considered the older forms of Chinese characters and variations of different Chinese regions, and the older forms of Japanese characters (kyūjitai).

Traditional characters that may cause problems displaying
Note that within the kyōiku kanji, there are 26 characters; the old forms of which may cause problems displaying:

 Grade 2 (2 kanji): 海  社
 Grade 3 (8 kanji): 勉  暑 漢 神 福  練  者 都
 Grade 4 (6 kanji): 器  殺 祝 節 梅 類 
 Grade 5 (1 kanji): 祖
 Grade 6 (9 kanji): 勤  穀  視  署  層 著 諸 難 朗
 Within the jōyō kanji, the same is true for 36 secondary-school kanji, so, in total, 62 of the 2,136 jōyō kanji have traditional forms that may cause problems displaying.

These characters are Unicode CJK Unified Ideographs for which the old form (kyūjitai) and the new form (shinjitai) have been unified under the Unicode standard. Although the old and new forms are distinguished under the JIS X 0213 standard, the old forms map to Unicode CJK Compatibility Ideographs which are considered by Unicode to be canonically equivalent to the new forms and may not be distinguished by user agents. Therefore, depending on the user environment, it may not be possible to see the distinction between old and new forms of the characters. In particular, all Unicode normalization methods merge the old characters with the new ones.

List of the simplified kyōiku kanji

For example, 万 is the simplified form of 萬.
Note that 弁 is used to simplify three different traditional characters (辨, 瓣, and 辯).

万 萬, 両 兩, 画 畫, 昼 晝, 蚕 蠶, 悪 惡, 旧 舊, 単 單, 巣 巢, 争 爭, 来 來, 乗 乘, 勉 勉, 厳 嚴, 予 豫, 変 變, 仏 佛, 会 會, 伝 傳, 仮 假, 体 體, 余 餘, 価 價, 児 兒, 並 竝, 円 圓, 写 寫, 労 勞, 効 效, 勤 勤, 区 區, 医 醫, 真 眞, 点 點, 圧 壓, 歴 歷, 台 臺, 弁 (辨 瓣 辯), 
参 參, 収 收, 号 號, 営 營, 器 器, 団 團, 図 圖, 囲 圍, 国 國, 売 賣, 声 聲, 塩 鹽, 増 增, 処 處, 条 條, 学 學, 実 實, 宝 寶, 専 專, 当 當, 県 縣, 党 黨, 届 屆, 属 屬, 層 層, 巻 卷, 帯 帶, 広 廣, 庁 廳, 応 應, 帰 歸, 径 徑, 従 從, 徳 德, 衛 衞, 戦 戰, 担 擔, 拡 擴, 拝 拜, 挙 擧, 数 數, 対 對, 断 斷, 晩 晚, 暑 暑, 栄 榮, 梅 梅, 桜 櫻, 検 檢, 楽 樂, 様 樣, 権 權, 横 橫, 欠 缺, 歩 步, 残 殘, 殺 殺, 穀 穀, 毎 每, 気 氣, 海 海, 浅 淺, 済 濟, 満 滿, 温 溫, 漢 漢, 灯 燈, 焼 燒, 状 狀, 将 將, 独 獨, 発 發, 研 硏, 礼 禮, 社 社, 神 神, 祖 祖, 祝 祝, 視 視, 福 福, 秘 祕, 節 節, 糸 絲, 経 經, 絵 繪, 続 續, 総 總, 練 練, 緑 綠, 縦 縱, 署 署, 者 者, 朗 朗, 脳 腦, 臓 臟, 乱 亂, 辞 辭, 芸 藝, 著 著, 蔵 藏, 薬 藥, 虫 蟲, 装 裝, 覚 覺, 覧 覽, 観 觀, 訳 譯, 証 證, 読 讀, 諸 諸, 豊 豐, 賛 贊, 転 轉, 軽 輕, 辺 邊, 都 都, 郷 鄕, 鉄 鐵, 鉱 鑛, 銭 錢, 録 錄, 関 關, 険 險, 雑 雜, 難 難, 静 靜, 類 類, 駅 驛, 験 驗, 麦 麥, 黄 黃, 黒 黑, 歯 齒

The kyōiku kanji and their Chinese hànzì equivalents

The characters are sorted by the radicals of the Japanese kanji. The two kokuji 働 and 畑, which have no Chinese equivalents, are not listed here.

Same form in Chinese and Japanese

The following kyōiku kanji are characters of Group 1 (not simplified in either language, e.g. 田).

一 丁 下 三 不 天 五 民 正 平 可 再 百 否 武 夏 中 内 出 本 世 申 由 史 冊 央 向 曲 印 州 表 果 半 必 永 求 九 丸 千 久 少 夫 午 失 末 未 包 年 危 后 兵 我 束 卵 承 垂 刷 重 省 看 勉 七 乳 才 予 事 二 元 亡 六 主 市 交 忘 夜 育 京 卒 商 率 就 人 化 今 仁 付 代 仕 他 令 以 合 全 任 休 件 仲 作 何 位 住 余 低 似 命 使 念 例 供 信 保 便 値 修 借 候 倍 俳 俵 健 停 働 像 先 入 八 分 公 共 弟 並 典 前 益 善 尊 同 周 次 兆 冷 弱 刀 切 別 判 制 券 刻 副 割 力 加 助 努 勇 勤 句 北 疑 十 古 孝 直 南 真 裁 博 上 反 灰 厚 原 台 能 友 収 口 司 右 兄 吸 告 君 味 呼 品 唱 器 四 回 因 困 固 土 去 地 在 寺 均 志 坂 幸 型 城 基 域 喜 境 士 冬 各 夕 外 名 多 大 太 奏 女 好 始 妻 姉 妹 姿 子 存 安 字 守 宅 宇 完 定 官 宙 宗 室 客 宣 家 害 案 容 宮 寄 密 宿 寒 富 察 寸 小 光 常 堂 尺 局 居 屋 展 山 岸 岩 炭 川 工 左 功 己 改 布 希 干 刊 幼 序 店 底 府 度 座 席 庭 康 延 建 式 弓 引 強 形 役 往 径 待 律 徒 得 街 心 快 性 忠 急 恩 情 感 想 成 戸 所 手 打 投 折 技 批 招 持 指 拾 接 推 探 授 提 操 支 政 故 教 救 散 敬 文 新 方 放 旅 族 旗 日 早 明 易 昔 春 星 昨 映 昭 最 量 景 晴 暗 暖 暴 曜 月 木 札 材 村 板 林 松 枚 枝 相 査 染 柱 格 校 根 株 械 植 棒 森 模 歌 止 整 死 列 段 母 毒 比 毛 氏 水 池 汽 法 治 波 油 注 河 泣 沿 泳 洋 活 派 洗 流 消 酒 浴 深 混 清 液 港 測 湖 源 演 潮 激 火 然 照  熟 燃 受 父 片 版 牛 物 牧 特 犬 犯 王 玉 班 理 球 望 生 用 田 男 町 思界 胃 留 略 病 痛 登 白 的 皇 泉 皮 皿 盛 盟 目 具 眼 矢 知  短 石 砂 破 磁 示 祭 禁 利 私 和 委 季 科 秋 秒 移 税 程 穴 究 空 立 童 竹 笑 第 笛 等 答 策 筋 算 管 箱 米 料 粉 精 糖 素 置 罪 羊 美 差 着 群 羽 翌 老 考 耕 耳 取 有 肉 服 肥 背 肺 胸 期 朝 腹 臣 自 息 至 舌 航 船 良 色 花 苦 若 英 芽 草 茶 荷 菜 落 幕 墓 蒸 暮 血 行 衣 初 西 要 票 角 解 言 警 谷 欲 豆 象 赤 走 起 足 路 身 射 返 近 述 送 追 退 逆 迷 通 速 造 道 郡 部 配 酸 番 里 野 防 限 院 降 除 陛 障 集 雨 雪 青 非 悲 面 革 音 章 意 食 首 骨 高

Different forms in Chinese and Japanese
The order is "Modern Japanese -Traditional Chinese - Simplified Chinese", e.g. 両-兩-两. Some characters were simplified the same way in both languages, the others were simplified in one language only.

万-萬-万, 両-兩-两, 画-畫-画, 昼-晝-昼, 蚕-蠶-蚕, 悪-惡-恶 , 旧-舊-旧, 師-師-师, 氷-冰-冰, 単-單-单, 巣-巢-巢, 業-業-业, 争-爭-争, 来-來- 来, 東-東-东, 乗-乘-乘, 島-島-岛, 劇-劇-剧, 厳-嚴-严, 願-願-愿, 変-變-变, 裏-裏-里, 仏-佛-佛, 会-會-会, 伝-傳-传, 仮-假-假, 体-體-体, 価-價-价, 舎-舍-舍, 係-係-系, 個-個-个, 倉-倉-仓, 側-側-侧, 備-備-备, 傷-傷-伤, 億-億-亿, 優-優-优, 児-兒-儿, 貧-貧-贫, 興-興-兴, 円-圓-圆, 写-寫-写, 軍-軍-军, 創-創-创, 労-勞-劳, 効-效-效, 動-動-动, 勢-勢-势, 区-區-区, 医-醫-医, 協-協-协, 準-準-准, 幹-幹-干, 点-點-点, 圧-壓-压, 歴-歷-历, 弁-(辨 瓣 辯)-(辨 瓣 辩), 参-參-参, 号-號-号, 員-員-员, 営-營-营, 鳴-鳴-鸣, 団-團-团, 図-圖-图, 囲-圍-围, 国-國-国, 園-園-园, 売-賣-卖, 声-聲-声, 場-場-场, 報-報-报, 塩-鹽-盐, 増-增-增, 処-處-处, 条-條-条, 奮-奮-奋, 婦-婦-妇, 学-學-学, 孫-孫-孙, 実-實-实, 宝-寶-宝, 憲-憲-宪, 専-專-专, 導-導-导, 当-當-当, 県-縣-县, 党-黨-党, 賞-賞-赏, 届-屆-届,	 属-屬-属, 層-層-层, 災-災-灾, 順-順-顺, 巻-卷-卷, 帯-帶-带, 帳-帳-帐 , 広-廣-广, 庁-廳-庁, 応-應-应, 庫-庫-库, 張-張-张, 帰-歸-归, 後-後-后, 従-從-从, 術-術-术, 復-復-复, 徳-德-德, 衛-衛-卫, 態-態-态, 慣-慣-惯, 戦-戰-战, 担-擔-担, 拡-擴-扩, 拝-拜-拜, 挙-擧-举, 採-採-采, 捨-捨-舍, 揮-揮-挥, 損-損-损, 数-數-数, 敵-敵-敌, 対-對-对, 断-斷-断, 時-時-时, 晩-晚-晚, 暑-暑-暑, 題 -題 -题,  栄-榮-荣, 梅-梅-梅, 桜-櫻-樱, 検-檢-检, 楽-樂-乐, 極-極-极, 様-樣-样, 構-構-构, 権-權-权, 横-橫-横, 標-標-标, 機-機-机, 樹-樹-树, 橋-橋-桥, 欠-缺-欠, 歩-步-歩, 残-殘-残, 殺-殺-杀, 穀-穀-谷, 毎-每-毎, 気-氣-气, 決-決-决, 海-海-海, 浅-淺-浅, 済-濟-济, 減-減-减, 満-滿-满, 温-溫-温,測-測-测, 湯-湯-汤, 漢-漢-汉, 漁-漁-渔, 潔-潔-洁, 灯-燈-灯, 無-無-无, 焼-燒-烧,熱-熱-热, 愛-愛-爱, 状-狀-状, 将-將-将, 独-獨-独, 現-現-现, 聖-聖-圣, 異-異-异, 発-發-发, 務-務-务, 研-硏-研, 確-確-确, 礼-禮-礼, 社-社-社, 神-神-神, 祖-祖-祖, 祝-祝-祝,視-視-视, 福-福-福, 秘-祕-秘, 種-種-种, 積-積-积, 窓-窗-窓, 産-産-产, 競-競-竞, 筆-筆-笔, 節-節-节, 築-築-筑, 簡-簡-简, 糸-絲-丝, 約-約-约, 級-級-级, 紅-紅-红, 紀-紀-纪, 紙-紙-纸, 納-納-纳, 純-純-纯, 経-經-经, 組-組-组, 終-終-终, 細-細-细, 結-結-结,絶-絶-绝, 給-給-给, 統-統-统, 絵-繪-绘, 続-續-续, 絹-絹-绢, 総-總-总, 練-練-练, 緑-綠-绿, 綿-綿-绵, 線-線-线, 編-編-编, 縦-縱-纵, 縮-縮-缩, 績-績-绩, 織-織-织, 買-買-买, 署-署-署, 義-義-义, 養-養-养, 習-習-习, 者-者-者, 職-職-职, 書-書-书, 脈-脈-脉, 朗-朗-朗, 脳-腦-脑, 勝-勝-胜, 腸-腸-肠, 臓-臟-脏, 臨-臨-临, 乱-亂-乱, 辞-辭-辞, 芸-藝-芸, 著-著-着, 葉-葉-叶, 夢-夢-梦, 蔵-藏-藏, 薬-藥-药, 虫-蟲-虫, 衆-衆-众, 装-裝-裝, 補-補-补, 製-製-制, 複-複-复, 見-見-见, 規-規-规, 覚-覺-觉, 親-親-亲, 覧-覽-览, 観-觀-观, 計-計-计, 記-記-记, 討-討-讨, 訓-訓-训, 設-設-设, 訳-譯-译, 許-許-许, 訪-訪-访, 証-證-证, 評-評-评, 詞-詞-词, 話-話-话, 試-試-试, 詩-詩-诗, 誠-誠-诚, 語-語-语, 読-讀-读, 説-説-说, 認-認-认, 誤-誤-误, 誌-誌-志, 調-調-调, 論-論-论, 談-談-谈, 課-課-课, 諸-諸-诸, 誕-誕-诞, 講-講-讲, 謝-謝-谢, 識-識-识, 議-議-议, 護-護-护, 豊-豐-丰, 頭-頭-头, 貝-貝-贝, 負-負-负, 則-則-则, 財-財-财, 敗-敗-败, 責-責-责, 貨-貨-货, 費-費-费, 貸-貸-贷, 貴-貴-贵, 貯-貯-贮, 賀-賀-贺, 貿-貿-贸, 資-資-资, 賃-賃-赁, 質-質-质, 賛-贊-赞, 車-車-车, 転-轉-转, 軽-輕-轻, 輪-輪-轮, 輸-輸-输, 農-農-农, 辺-邊-边, 連-連-连, 進-進-进, 週-週-周, 過-過-过, 運-運-运, 達-達-达, 遊-遊-游, 遠-遠-远, 適-適-适, 選-選-选, 遺-遺-遗, 都-都-都, 郷-鄕-乡, 郵-郵-邮, 針-針-针, 鉄-鐵-铁, 鉱-鑛-矿, 銀-銀-银, 銅-銅-铜, 銭-錢-钱, 録-錄-录, 鋼-鋼-钢, 鏡-鏡-镜, 長-長-长, 門-門-门, 問-問-问, 閉-閉-闭, 間-間-间, 開-開-开, 関-關-关, 聞-聞-闻, 閣-閣-阁, 陸-陸-陆, 険-險-险, 隊-隊-队, 階-階-阶, 陽-陽-阳, 際-際-际, 雑-雜-杂, 難-難-难, 雲-雲-云, 電-電-电, 静-靜-静, 頂-頂-顶, 預-預-预, 領-領-领, 顔-顏-颜, 類-類-类, 額-額-额, 風-風-风, 飛-飛-飞, 飲-飲-饮, 飯-飯-饭, 飼-飼-饲, 館-館-馆, 馬-馬-马, 駅-驛-驿, 験-驗-验, 魚-魚-鱼, 鳥-鳥-鸟, 麦-麥-麦, 黄-黃-黄, 黒-黑-黑, 鼻-鼻-鼻, 歯-齒-齿

See also
 
 MEXT
 List of jōyō kanji
 List of kanji by stroke count

References

External links
Kanji-Trainer.org A free flashcard-style kanji learning tool including selection by kyōiku-kanji, explaining the components of each character and providing mnemonic phrases.
  Official list of kyōiku kanji by grade

Kanji
Education in Japan